Wow... That's Crazy is the sixth studio album by American rapper Wale. It was released on October 11, 2019, by Every Blue Moon, Maybach Music Group and Warner Records. The production on the album was handled by multiple producers including: Hit-Boy, OZ, Ayo & Keyz, The Arcade and Bizness Boi among others. The album also features guest appearance by Meek Mill, Rick Ross, Bryson Tiller, Ari Lennox, Boogie, 6lack, Lil Durk, and more.

Wow... That's Crazy was supported by five singles: "On Chill", "BGM", "Love & Loyalty", "Love... (Her Fault)" and "Sue Me". The album received generally positive reviews from music critics and was a moderate commercial success. It debuted at number seven on the US Billboard 200 with 38,000 album-equivalent units in its first week. The album was certified gold by the Recording Industry Association of America (RIAA) in November 2021.

Background
In 2018, Wale announced that he parted ways with Atlantic Records, and released three EPs with Warner Records throughout the year: It's Complicated, Self Promotion, and Free Lunch.

Singles
Wale released "Black Bonnie" and "Poledancer" in 2018 as promotional singles.

The first single from the album, "On Chill" featuring Jeremih, was released on July 12, 2019. On August 26, the second single "BGM" was released. He released the third single on October 1, titled "Loyalty & Love" featuring Mannywellz.

"Love... (Her Fault)", featuring Bryson Tiller was released as a single in January 2020. 
The album opener "Sue Me", featuring Kelly Price was released as a single in April 2020. "Sue Me" was performed as a medley with "Love... (Her Fault)", alongside Price on The Daily Show with Trevor Noah on February 11, 2020, in which Wale paid tribute to Kobe Bryant and Bryant's daughter Gianna. A video, in the form of a short-film, was released for "Sue Me" on April 22, 2020. Rap-Up described the video as "provocative and powerful", showcasing "an alternate reality where the black and white experience are reversed".

Commercial performance
Wow... That's Crazy debuted at number seven on the US Billboard 200 chart, earning 38,000 album-equivalent units (including 5,000 copies in pure album sales) in its first week. This became Wale's fourth US top-ten debut on the chart. On November 30, 2021, the album was certified gold by the Recording Industry Association of America (RIAA) for combined sales and album-equivalent units of over 500,000 units in the United States.

Track listing

Notes
  signifies an additional producer
  signifies a co-producer

Charts

Certifications

References

2019 albums
Albums produced by Hit-Boy
Warner Records albums
Wale (rapper) albums
Maybach Music Group albums